The Prindle 18 is an American catamaran sailing dinghy that was designed by Geoffrey Prindle as a racer and first built in 1977.

Geoffrey Prindle had started out as a surfboard manufacturer, but was also successful racing Hobie 14 catamarans and started his own line of boats, starting with the Prindle 16.

Production
The design was initially built by Surfglas, a surfboard manufacturer that changed its name to Prindle Catamarans. The boat was also built by Lear Siegler Inc. in the United States. A total of 2,300 boats were built, but it is now out of production.

The design was replaced in the manufacturer's line by the Prindle 18-2 in 1983, a more conventional design, with straight hulls and centerboards.

Design
The Prindle 18 is a recreational sailboat, built predominantly of fiberglass. It has a fractional sloop rig with aluminum spars, a rotating mast and a fully-battened mainsail, using foam and fiberglass sail battens. The mast spreaders are adjustable for rake. The dual asymmetrical hulls have raked stems, slightly reverse transoms and dual transom-hung, kick-up beaching rudders controlled by a tiller. The hulls are both rockered and have no keels or daggerboards. The design displaces  and features a mesh trampoline between the hulls.

This beachcat design has a draft of  allowing beaching. The hinged mast also facilitates ground transportation on a trailer.

For sailing the design may be equipped with one or two trapezes. It has a 4:1 mechanical advantage downhaul, an outhaul and mast rotation controls. The jib luff is attached with a zipper.

The design has a Portsmouth Yardstick racing average handicap of 74.5 and is normally raced with a crew of two sailors.

See also
List of sailing boat types
List of multihulls

References

External links

Dinghies
Catamarans
1970s sailboat type designs
Two-person sailboats
Sailboat type designs by Geoffrey Prindle
Sailboat types built by Prindle Catamarans
Sailboat types built by Surfglas
Sailboat types built by Lear Siegler